Raffaele Avagnano (born 21 August 1963) is a retired breaststroke swimmer from Italy, who represented his native country at the 1984 Summer Olympics in Los Angeles, California. He claimed the gold medal a year earlier at the 1983 Mediterranean Games in the Men's 100m Breaststroke event.

References
 Profile

1963 births
Living people
Swimmers at the 1984 Summer Olympics
Olympic swimmers of Italy
Mediterranean Games gold medalists for Italy
Swimmers at the 1983 Mediterranean Games
Mediterranean Games medalists in swimming
Italian male breaststroke swimmers
20th-century Italian people
21st-century Italian people